Telford is an unincorporated community in Lincoln County, in the U.S. state of Washington.

History
A post office called Telford was established in 1909, and remained in operation until 1917. The community was named after M. A. Telford, a local cattleman.

References

Unincorporated communities in Lincoln County, Washington
Unincorporated communities in Washington (state)